Brodequin may refer to:

 Brodequin (torture), a mediaeval torture device
 Brodequin (band), American death metal group